"The Statue" is the sixth episode of the second season of the NBC sitcom Seinfeld, and the show's 11th episode overall. In the episode, protagonist Jerry Seinfeld (Jerry Seinfeld) inherits some of his grandfather's old possessions. One of these is a statue, resembling one that his friend George Costanza (Jason Alexander) broke when he was ten years old. When Jerry sees the statue in the house of Ray (Michael D. Conway), the man who cleaned his apartment, he believes Ray stole the statue. Jerry struggles to get back at Ray, as his friend Elaine Benes (Julia Louis-Dreyfus) is editing a book written by Ray's girlfriend.

The episode was written by Larry Charles and directed by Tom Cherones. The character of Jerry's neighbor Kramer (Michael Richards) is developed in this episode, as he goes undercover as a cop to retrieve the statue. Charles was interested in the development of Kramer, as he felt George and Jerry had their counterparts in co-creators Larry David and Seinfeld. Richards enjoyed how Kramer acted in the episode and encouraged Charles to continue exploiting the character. "The Statue" first aired on NBC on April 11, 1991 in the United States and was watched by over 23 million American homes.

Plot
Jerry inherits some of his grandfather Irving's old possessions. Among them is a statue that looks just like one George's family had until George broke it. Jerry promises that George can have it, but leaves it in his apartment for a few days. Kramer takes a few of Irving's old clothes, including a hat which he believes makes him look like Joe Friday of Dragnet. Elaine persuades Jerry to have his apartment cleaned by her client Rava's (Nurit Koppel) boyfriend Ray (Michael D. Conway). Jerry is very impressed by the quality of the cleaning; however, when he and Elaine visit Rava, Jerry notices a statue with a vivid similarity to the one he inherited and believes Ray stole it. He calls Kramer to check his apartment  but Rava walks back in to the room while he is on the phone. Jerry pretends to be talking to his mother in Florida and swiftly hangs up with no confirmation from Kramer as to whether the statue is present in his apartment or not. Jerry’s suspicion is neither confirmed or denied by the phone call.

While discussing the situation later, Kramer urges Jerry to do something about it but Elaine argues that Rava will no longer let her edit her book if he does. Jerry calls Ray and has lunch with him while George sits in the next booth and eavesdrops on their conversation. Jerry ask him about the statue, but Ray gets offended and leaves when he hears about his suspicions. Elaine and Rava get into an argument about Jerry's accusation, and Elaine throws Rava's book into the garbage over the fight. Without notifying anybody, Kramer dresses up in Irving's old clothes and goes to Ray's apartment, pretending to be a cop, and recovers the statue. Kramer returns the statue to a grateful George. But while George is holding the statue, Kramer gives him a friendly pat on the back and causes him to drop the statue, which breaks when it hits the floor, as the episode abruptly ends.

Cultural references

 George explains that he broke the original statue while using it as a microphone and singing the song "MacArthur Park" by Jimmy Webb; in early drafts of the script, George broke it while singing Eddie Cochran's "Summertime Blues."
 The episode contains numerous references to the television crime drama Dragnet. This was because writer Larry Charles watched a lot of reruns of the show while writing for Seinfeld. Kramer's manner when he retrieves the statue was inspired by Joe Friday, the central character of Dragnet.
 At the end of the episode Kramer states, "Well, let's put it this way: I didn't take him to People's Court", a reference to the judicial television show.

Production

The episode was written by Larry Charles and directed by Tom Cherones, who directed all of the episodes in Season 2. "The Statue" was the second episode Charles wrote for the show, though it was the first to be aired. Charles was mostly interested in the development of the Kramer character, as he felt "Jerry and George were so well-defined through Larry [David] and Jerry, that there was less room for me to, sort of, expand on those personas. But Kramer was very unformed at the beginning of the show and it gave me an area of creativity to, sort of, expand upon. So I spent a lot of time with Kramer because he was a character that I could have an impact on in the future of the show." Richards enjoyed how his character evolved and, after the filming of the episode, went to Seinfeld, Charles and David and said "we should keep going that way." He cites this episode, as well as "The Revenge" (in which Kramer puts concrete in a washing machine), as episodes that really defined the character.

The first read-through of the episode was held on January 23, 1991, the same night the second season premiered. "The Statue" was filmed in front of a live audience six days later. A few scenes were changed prior to filming; in an early draft of the script Elaine sat next to George eavesdropping on Jerry and Ray's conversation. She would wear a floppy hat to look inconspicuous and complain about it, stating that she looks like one of the Cowsills, a singing group that was active between the 1960s and 1970s. The same scene initially featured George admitting that he spied on Ray a day earlier, showing Ray pictures of him in a bar. Ray would reply that it was his day off and asks why George is not at work, to which George replies that he should be getting back and leaves. In the original script, Elaine and Rava would argue over who is a better person: Jerry or Ray.

Writer's assistant Karen Wilkie can be seen in the audience during Seinfeld's stand-up comedy act. Nurit Koppel, who portrayed Rava, was known for her appearance in the CBS television movie Sweet Bird of Youth (1989) as well as a guest appearance on the NBC crime drama Hunter. Jane Leeves, who later appeared as Marla the Virgin in season four and season nine, also auditioned for the part; she went on to star in the NBC sitcom Frasier (1993–2004). In the script, Ray Thomas' description was, "although he carries cleaning equipment, he also carries the air of a pretentious mannerly, affected actor." Various actors auditioned for the part, including Hank Azaria, Michael D. Conway and Tony Shalhoub, who had also auditioned for the part of Kramer. Conway was eventually cast for the part. Norman Brenner, who worked as Richards' stand-in on the show for all its nine seasons, appears as an extra; he appears in the background when Jerry and Ray talk at Monk's Cafe.

Reception
First broadcast in the United States on NBC on April 11, 1991, "The Statue" gained a Nielsen rating of 16.1 and an audience share of 26. This means that 16.1% of American households watched the episode, and that 26% of all televisions in use at the time were tuned into it. Nielsen estimated that over 23 million people watched the episode's initial broadcast, making it the tenth most-watched program of the week it was broadcast in.

The episode received mixed reactions from critics. Writing for Entertainment Weekly, critics Mary Kaye Schilling and Mike Flaherty stated "Even Seinfeld's bit players must have some grounding in reality — you need to love to hate them. Ultimately, there's no redeeming comic payoff to Rava's and Ray's weirdness." Flaherty and Schilling graded the episode with a C−. Colin Jacobson of the DVD Movie Guide called the episode's storyline "fairly pedestrian," but felt the performances of Conway and Koppel saved the episode.

References

External links

 

Seinfeld (season 2) episodes
1991 American television episodes